Gmina Wleń is an urban-rural gmina (administrative district) in Lwówek Śląski County, Lower Silesian Voivodeship, in south-western Poland.

Neighbouring gminas
Gmina Wleń is bordered by the gminas of Jeżów Sudecki, Lubomierz, Lwówek Śląski, Pielgrzymka and Świerzawa.

Villages
Apart from the town of Wleń, the gmina contains the villages of Bełczyna, Bystrzyca, Klecza, Łupki, Marczów, Modrzewie, Nielestno, Pilchowice, Przeździedza, Radomice, Strzyżowiec, Tarczyn and Wleński Gródek.

References

Wlen
Lwówek Śląski County